The Stonington Historical Society is an organization in Stonington, Connecticut.  It operates a museum at the historic Stonington Harbor Light and it operates the Capt. Nathaniel B. Palmer House, a U.S. National Historic Landmark.

See also
List of historical societies

References

External links
Stonington Historical Society, official site

Historical societies in Connecticut
Stonington, Connecticut